The 1978–79 Auburn Tigers men's basketball team represented Auburn University in the 1978–79 college basketball season. 

Auburn began the year with newly-hired Paul Lambert as head coach, but Lambert died in a hotel fire in Columbus, Georgia on June 6, 1978 before ever coaching a game.  Sonny Smith from East Tennessee State was hired as coach. 

The team played their home games at Memorial Coliseum in Auburn, Alabama. They finished the season 13–16, 5–13 in SEC play. They defeated Vanderbilt and Georgia to advance to the semifinals of the SEC tournament where they lost to Tennessee.

Roster

References

Auburn Tigers men's basketball seasons
Auburn
Auburn Tigers
Auburn Tigers